Nagambie  is a town in the Goulburn Valley region of Victoria, Australia. The city is on the Goulburn Valley Freeway north of Seymour and in the Shire of Strathbogie.

History
The Nagambie Region is within the traditional lands of the Taungurung people, who are the first people of the rivers, valleys and mountains in this region.  The Taungurung people lived according to the natural cycles and rhythms of the land moving through their country seasonally, occupying the more cooler mountain areas in summer and autumn and the tributaries of the Goulburn River in winter and spring.  

The Goulburn River at Nagambie, prior to the formation of the lakes through the creation of the Goulburn Weir, was the site of several lagoons, which along with nearby Reedy lake provided an ideal camping place for the Taungurung people.

The river and the associated tributaries and wetlands  provided an abundance  of food resources, emus, kangaroos, possums and wombats were hunted by Taungurung for food and clothing.  The river ecosystem also provided fresh water fish, eels, crustaceans and waterfowl.

Another well-known Greenstone Quarry is at Mt William (Woi Wurrung Country) to the south.

Taungurung people would travel between Reedy lake and Mt Carmel for procurement of stone. Conveniently spaced camping places were used to make the journey along the trade route; from Gunn's swamp (now Waranga Basin), to the rock well at Whroo, and then to lake Cooper at the foothills of the Mt Carmel Ranges. Taungurung people could also obtain quartz and silcrete for the manufacture of tools for hunting and food preparation from Mt Balck (within the Helathcote-Graytown National Park). Today, Taungurung people still live on country and are very active in the protection and preservation of their culture and land.

From the time of white settlement, a river crossing had been developed on the Goulburn River by overlanders following the route used by explorer Thomas Mitchell, and this was later used by the mail route from Melbourne to Sydney, established in 1838. A hotel, church and blacksmith were later set up, serving traffic traveling along the river system to Adelaide. The town was surveyed in 1868, with land sales in 1870.

The Post Office opened on 2 May 1870, it was proclaimed as the private town of "Nagambie" in 1872, and the Nagambie railway station was opened in 1880. It is now served by V/Line on the Shepparton Line to Melbourne.

Nagambie sits on the shores of Lake Nagambie, an artificial lake created by the Goulburn Weir in 1891, where rowing regattas and waterskiing tournaments are held.The town holds the Australian Rowing Championships semi-regularly.

Events and attractions
Nagambie is home to the Nagambie Lakes - which form a regional reservoir, and venue for many state and national rowing championships. The Nagambie Lakes Regatta Centre is one of Victoria's major water sports facilities. The venue offers a 2000m, fully buoyed, National Standard rowing and canoeing course.

Nagambie On Water is an annual community event, featuring water themed activities, grape stomping, river to pub races and many other elements. This event is held in March each year.

New Year's Eve Fireworks are also held in the Nagambie Lakes area.

Nagambie Lakes Community Market runs monthly on the bank of Lake Nagambie and a Farmers Market on the fourth Sunday of the month at Tahbilk winery.

Wine

Nagambie gives its name to the Nagambie Lakes wine region, a subregion of the Goulburn Valley wine region.

The town hosts the Goulburn Valley Vintage Festival in March each year, and the Shiraz Challenge in November. A number of wineries are situated in the area, including Mitchelton, and Tahbilk.

Highway bypass

The Goulburn Valley Highway was originally routed through the centre of Nagambie, bringing often large volumes of through traffic from Melbourne and Seymour en route to Shepparton and southern New South Wales.

The town was bypassed in 2013 with the completion of the freeway-standard road routed on the eastern side of the town, from the previous limit of the freeway, to 6 km north of Nagambie.

The effect of the removal of the through traffic is a dramatically quieter environment. Business and trade in the town generated by vehicle stops has also dried up, this is expected to be taken up by a petrol station & fast food complex to be located on north and southbound locations on the bypass freeway. Whilst the town has experienced a decline in traffic, there has been recent development of significant housing estates. These include the Elloura Lake Nagambie Development  and further estate development in the north and south of the area.

It is now possible to travel from Melbourne to Shepparton on a freeway-standard road without traveling through any of the towns previously served by the Hume and Goulburn Valley highways.

Education
Nagambie has a Catholic school and a public school.

Sport
Nagambie Football Club compete in the Kyabram & District Football League.

Golfers play at the course of the Nagambie Golf Club on the former Goulburn Valley Highway.

Nagambie was the birthplace of the champion racehorse Black Caviar.

Media

Print
 Nagambie Community Voice 
 Euroa Gazette
 Shepparton News
 Seymour Telegraph

Radio

Community radio heard in Nagambie:
 103.9 - 103.9 FM Seymour-FM (Community Radio for Northern Mitchell Shire & Strathbogie Shire)
 88.0 - The Range (Country Music)
 87.6 - TBA

Shepparton radio heard in Nagambie
 94.5 - Triple J (ABC)
 95.3 - Triple M (formerly 3SR FM)
 96.1 - ABC Classic
 96.9 - HIT Goulburn Valley (formerly STAR FM)
 97.7 - ABC Goulburn Murray
 98.5 - ONE FM (Shepparton Community Radio)

Television
 ABC  (plus ABC HD, ABC TV Plus, ABC Kids, ABC Me & ABC News)
 SBS  (plus SBS HD, SBS Viceland, SBS World Movies, SBS Food & NITV)
 Seven  (plus 7HD, 7TWO, 7mate & 7flix)
 WIN (plus 9HD, 9Gem, 9Go! & 9Life)
 Southern Cross 10 (plus 10 HD, 10 Bold, 10 Peach & 10 Shake)

Gallery

References

External links

Towns in Victoria (Australia)
Shire of Strathbogie